The Bishop's Tower, or Bishop's Castle, is an archaeological site in the historic city center of Hamburg, Germany, containing the oldest known remains of a stone building in the city. The site includes the foundations of a circular tower and a well, originally believed to represent the 11th-century stone residence of Archbishop Adalbrand of Bremen. Later finds, however, disproved this theory and it is now considered to be part of a 12th-century defensive structure.

Location and significance 
The area is a light geest, where the first settlement of Hamburg has been documented. The base of the tower was discovered on 30 August 1962 during demolition work for the St. Peter's Community Center. Initially it was assumed that displaced boulders from nearby  had been found, which is believed to be the oldest street of the city of Hamburg, and an ancient trade route. But after further excavation the remaining foundations of the tower were uncovered.

Until the 2008 excavations, it was thought to be the stone house of the Archbishop Adalbrand, built as a round tower and mentioned in the Hamburg church history of 1074 by Adam of Bremen. With this information the dating was corrected to the 12th century. A possible interpretation is that the tower represents a side gate or a part of the city gate.

The finds 

The showroom 
A showroom was built for the tower's foundations and other artifacts in early 1969 in the basement of the newly completed community center (and later commercial building). After demolition in 2008 for the construction of the  building, the showroom was redesigned as a branch of the Hamburg Archaeological Museum. It is now freely accessible to visitors through a commercial bakery on the ground floor, which has also set up a café amidst the tower's foundations.

Literature

References

 This article has been translated in part from the German Wikipedia equivalent.

External links 

 Hamburg Archaeological Museum: The Bishop's Tower  
 Mythos Hammaburg: The Excavation at Cathedral Square 

Castles in Hamburg
Buildings and structures in Hamburg-Mitte
Heritage sites in Hamburg
Museums in Hamburg
Archäologisches Museum Hamburg
12th-century architecture
1962 archaeological discoveries
Round towers